Thalaivii is a 2021 Indian biographical drama film based on the life of Indian actress-politician J. Jayalalithaa. The film stars Kangana Ranaut as Jayalalithaa, Arvind Swamy as M. G. Ramachandran.
And Raj Arjun as R. M. Veerappan. Shot simultaneously in  Tamil and Hindi, it is directed by A. L. Vijay and written by Madhan Karky (Tamil) and Rajat Arora (Hindi). The Movie is produced by Vishnu Vardhan Induri and Shailesh R Singh of Vibri Motion Pictures and Karma Media And Entertainment respectively. The film also features  Nassar, Bhagyashree, Raj Arjun, Madhoo, Thambi Ramaiah, Shamna Kasim and Samuthirakani in supporting roles. The music, background score and the soundtrack for both languages is composed by G. V. Prakash Kumar.

The film was launched officially on Jayalalithaa's birth anniversary on 24 February 2019. Initially the film was titled Thalaivi in Tamil and Jaya in Hindi, but the makers later planned to release it under the title Thalaivi in Hindi as well. Principal shooting began on 10 November 2019 and completed in December 2020. The film release was postponed due to rise in COVID-19 cases and lockdown in Maharashtra. It was later rescheduled to release on 10 September 2021, with the new title Thalaivii.

The film received mixed response upon release, film critics praised Ranaut and Swamy's strong performances but criticised the screenplay of the film. Several publications ranked the film on various year-end best films lists of 2021.

Plot
In 1989, Jayalalithaa (nicknamed Jaya), a member of the Tamil Nadu Legislative Assembly questions the current chief minister, M. Karunanidhi, about the corruption charges, arrests and eavesdropping leveled against her and her party. She demands his resignation and upholds the preceding Chief Minister, M. G. Ramachandran, as someone who truly served the people. However, the opposition questions her relationship with MGR, resulting in a brawl after Jaya is slapped. Some MLAs from the ruling party attempt to disrobe Jaya; comparing herself to Draupadi, Jaya pledges she would return to the session only after becoming the Chief Minister.

In 1965, MGR is at the peak of his film career; producer R M Veerappan fires Saroja Devi and even burns all traces of her character in his next film after she shows affection to MGR as Veerappan believes that MGR must stay celibate to preserve popular perception of him as a "god". Jaya, then 16 years old, is pushed by her mother Sandhya, a yesteryear actress, to act. Jaya replaces Savitri, but her unenthusiastic attitudes manifests itself in haughtiness. After realizing her mother just want her to succeed in career and after she is touched by MGR's respect to a crew member hurt on set, Jaya takes a softer stand. The film is a success, so MGR and Jaya shoot more films together and grow fonder. Veerappan again tries to ward off Jaya but she uses her wit to make him back off. Still, Jaya is hurt knowing that she's the other woman in eyes of public, as MGR is married to Janaki. Jaya repeatedly says she touches her hero thinking as if she hugs her mother, she considers MGR as protector like her father, her brother. She realizes she is not respected by few people close to MGR, when MGR was shot in the neck and hospitalized. As MGR recovers, Veerappan hires another heroine for MGR's next film and offers full and final settlement to Jaya to stop her continuous lead pairing with MGR. Jaya tries to discuss this with MGR but he brushes this away, saying it is a matter of one film. To retaliate, Jaya praises MGR's rival Sivaji Ganesan in a press conference and makes a hit film with him while MGR's next film becomes flop. MGR apologizes and gets her to star in more films with him.

MGR enters politics with his friend Karunanidhi, but his film schedule interferes with his party duties, leading to his ouster. MGR meets Jaya to tell her he has chosen politics over career in films and leaves with Veerappan. Meanwhile, her mother Sandhya's demise affects Jaya to a great extent. On board a flight, she is seated beside MGR only to know why he couldn't attend her mother's funeral. Jaya says she cannot be the other woman in his life anymore and does not want to meet secretly to have a conversation. MGR wins the election to be the Chief Minister again while Jaya is offered a film for playing the character of an elder sister in 1981. However, Jaya refuses such offers. Jaya accepts a stage performance at a government event in Madurai, where MGR is the guest. He meets her backstage to discuss their memories. By whistling, he takes a moment to appreciate her performance in privacy and wants her to join politics. However, she refuses initially because politics is something she dislikes.

Touched by the condition of girls and other children's education in schools, Jaya highlights the midday meal services under MGR's name by serving him the unhygienic food at his office. MGR inspects the mid-day meal service himself. He advises Jaya to take up the mid-day meal service program for the state to which she agrees and forays into politics. She is fondly called “Amma” by locals. She markets the food scheme door to door and continues to partner with MGR, politically. Jaya takes the portfolio of education, also. Meanwhile, elections are around the corner and a saint is killed. The opposition takes advantage of the situation and says the current political party has “no man left” as they are under Jaya's influence in the party. In a political address to clear the air, stones are pelt at her. To stop the pelting, she speak in opposition of MGR. However, she successfully changes the opinion of the crowd, pointing out and is assigned the job of the party's propaganda secretary, and ends up running in winning that district. Now an MP she is sent to New Delhi to meet the Prime Minister, Indira Gandhi, but is blatantly barred from doing so.

In a Rajya Sabha session, LK Advani requests the speaker let Jaya speak about South India's situation. Boldly speaking on the disregard of South India and the issue of splitting power generated from the Kalpakkam electricity project, an impressed Gandhi allows her in. Jaya creates a controversial alliance with Congress that was heard by MGR through news. Seen as a betrayal, Jaya was expelled from the position of secretary by Veerappan while MGR is flown to the United States for treatment, leading to a dire situation. Veerappan finds out that Indira Gandhi has been shot dead. However, Rajiv Gandhi calls up Veerappan to let Jaya campaign for the party during MGR's absence. The campaigning saves the party and it continues to stay in force. On his return from USA, MGR and Rajiv Gandhi discuss on how Jaya kept the spirit alive. Impressed again, MGR plans to meet Jaya on a dinner, prepared at her home in 1987. Jaya awaits MGR overnight only to know in the wee hours that he is no more. Post MGR's demise, Veerappan wants MGR's wife Janaki to take the responsibility of MGRs position but Janaki accepts her defeat and steps back from politics, saying Jaya has done more for the public. Thus, Karunanidhi takes the reigns of power.

Back in 1990, a lorry runs into Jaya's car as part of a plot against her and her assistant Sasikala. Despite her situation, she manages to campaign. Sasikala passes a note to Jaya during her campaign, only to know of Rajiv Gandhi's assassination. After campaigning, her party wins nearly every seat. Finally, she enters the legislature again as the Chief Minister of Tamil Nadu and gets the respect she deserves.

Cast

Production

Development 
Vishnu Vardhan Induri decided to make a film based on the life of AIADMK's former general secretary J. Jayalalithaa, who served six times as the chief minister of Tamil Nadu for more than fourteen years between 1991 and 2016. Producer Vishnu Vardhan Induri approached A. L. Vijay in early 2018, to direct the film. Vijay and Vishnu researched extensively for eight months to come up with the story. To make the writing more effective, Vishnu brought in V. Vijayendra Prasad for the script who further developed the script.

In August 2018, Vidya Balan was reported to play the lead character when the film initially came to news. However, when the project was launched on 24 February 2019 (Jayalalithaa's birth anniversary), under the title Thalaivii, the makers had approached Kangana Ranaut to play Jayalalithaa's role, as Vijay stated that her role will be apt for the film. Ranaut officially confirmed her part in March 2019, with the shooting being supposed to held in July 2019.

As per Kangana, there will be two parts of the film. The first part focuses on life of Jayalalilthaa from 16 to 40. There will be a second film, where her life from 41 to her death in 2016 will get covered. In November 2019, it was revealed that the biopic will be shot simultaneously in Hindi, Tamil, and Telugu. However, the Telugu version was dropped in favor of a dubbed release.

Casting and characters 

Ranaut started preparing for her role in May 2019. In September 2019, prosthetic specialist Jason Collins, who worked on Captain Marvel (2019), was hired to design Ranaut's looks and it has been reported that she will sport four looks in the film. Both Ranaut and Vijay headed to Los Angeles to undergo the prosthetic sessions. Ranaut also trained under dance master Gayathri Raghuram to choreograph Bharatanatyam sequences for this film so as to suit for the character. The second round of look tests were held during October, which led Ranaut to spend nearly two months for the preparation of her role. She also gained 20 kilos for her role in the film.

In October 2019, Arvind Swami was roped in to play the role of M. G. Ramachandran. The very same month, the makers approached Prakash Raj to play the role of DMK politician M. Karunanidhi, although he donned a similar character inspiring the politician in the 1997 film Iruvar. Vijay Deverakonda was reported to play the role of Sobhan Babu, Jayalalithaa's close aide, before Jisshu Sengupta was finalised; however, this role was later dropped. Similarly, Priyamani was approached to play V. K. Sasikala, but, she could not allot dates for the film and the role went to Poorna; Madhoo essayed the role of V. N. Janaki.

Filming 
Principal shooting began in Mysore on 10 November 2019. A huge set for a song sequence was erected at a studio in Chennai, and began filming on 1 February 2020, featuring Ranaut in a Bharatanatyam attire. During the song shoot Ashwiny Iyer Tiwari, whom Ranaut worked in Panga (2020) made a visit to the sets. Production was halted due to the COVID-19 pandemic, with major portions being filmed, Ranaut stated not to resume shoot as the climax scene requires more than 3000 extras and is to be made on a large scale. After multiple delays, the makers filmed the climax scene in mid-November 2020, with production being completed in December 2020.

Music

The music for the film is composed by G. V. Prakash Kumar and lyrics written by Madhan Karky (Tamil version) and Irshad Kamil (Hindi version) and Sira Sri, Bhaskarabhatla, Ramajogayya Sastry, Krishna Chaitanya and Kalyana Chakravarthy (Telugu dubbed version). The music rights are acquired by Lahari Music and T-Series.

Marketing and release 
The first look and teaser released on 23 November 2019, received positive response praising Ranaut's transformation. However, a section of audience expressed disappointment over the "terrible" prosthetics and initiated a troll fest through Twitter. Some netizens claimed that any other actor should have done better in place of Ranaut and further upset that she could end up "tarnishing Jayalalithaa's image through this film". However, Ranaut's sister Rangoli Chandel defended the actress, saying that "those who got eyes can see the fantastic work done by the prosthetic team".

The film was initially scheduled for a theatrical release on 26 June 2020, but was postponed due to the COVID-19 pandemic in India. In June 2020, the team announced that the film will have a theatrical release and may not have a direct OTT release. The film was then scheduled for release theatrically on 23 April 2021 in Hindi, Tamil, and Telugu languages. As of April 2021, the release date of film was indefinitely delayed due to rise in COVID-19 cases and lockdown in Maharashtra. It was later rescheduled to release on 10 September 2021, with the new title Thalaivii. The film will be available for streaming on Netflix and Amazon Prime Video simultaneously, four weeks after its theatrical release.

The makers of Thalaivii announced a two-week window for the Hindi version and a four-week window for Tamil and Telugu versions of the film before its release in the OTT services. Multiplex chains PVR Cinemas and INOX have expressed their disapproval over this policy and appealed for a uniform four-week window across all the language versions. Ranaut responded they could a find a solution with the talks so that "the Hindi version can also find love and appreciation on the big screen."

Thalaivii after limited and single screen theatrical release in India, It was released on Netflix (Hindi) 2 weeks later and on Amazon Prime Video (Tamil, Telugu, Kannada, Malayalam) 4 weeks later with respect to the deals made by producers with OTT platforms. The Hindi version of the film had its world television premiere on Zee Cinema on Christmas Day, 25 December 2021. The film was anonymously dubbed in Bengali as Thalaivii Netri and was released on YouTube.

Reception

Box office

The Indian Express reported that the movie had a dismal opening. The Hindi version earned ₹20 lakhs on Day 1, while it earned ₹80 lakhs in Tamil Nadu. Total Day 1 collection was reported to be ₹1.25 crore.

The film was a box office failure.

Critical reception
Upon release, Thalaivii was met with mixed reviews from film critics; Ranaut and Swamy's performance was praised but the screenplay of the film drew criticism. Review aggregator website Rotten Tomatoes reports that 22% of 9 critic reviews were positive, with an average rating of 5.9/10.

India 
Bollywood Hungama critics rounded the review with a score of 3.5 on 5, calling the film overall a well-made and well-written political saga that is embellished with yet another award-winning performance by Kangana Ranaut. Also, Critic based at The Times of India, Renuka Vyawahare said: "Kangana & Arvind Swamy pay a resounding ode to Jaya-MGR’s poignant love story". She awarded the film 3.5/5 score. However, she added: "The political aspect feels talky, half baked and one-sided." In her review for The Indian Express, Shubhra Gupta wrote, "For a film that revolves around Kangana Ranaut as J Jayalalithaa, it does give others their due: Arvind Swamy as MGR, Bhagyashree as Jaya’s mother and Nassar as Karunanidhi." She awarded the film 3 stars on 5.

Unmesh Panwani of Koimoi rated the film 2.5 on 5, adding. "All said and done, Thalaivii has a lot of good things going in its favour but it remains half-baked only for the reason of ‘what it could’ve been?" Saibal Chatterjee in his review for NDTV called the film botched by massive missteps, the film as Amma (Mother) of all misfires. However, he praised a few of the performances, especially Arvind Swami, who "absolutely nails the MGR impersonation." He gave the film 2 out of 5 score. Lakshmi Subramaniam of The Week pointed: "Thalaivii may come across as a melodramatic excuse for a biopic." She awarded a score of 2 on 5.

Film critic Deepa Gahlot wrote: "Kangana Ranaut gets the look right, but is unable to completely inhabit the dynamism of the character, which Arvind Swami does with enviable ease in an award-worthy performance." Baradwaj Rangan of Film Companion described Thalaivii as a "larger-than-life movie told in an almost mythical masala mode" and wrote, "Scene after scene, the achievement of the film is how there’s always something new that keeps your eyes riveted, even though you already know these stories". Nandini Ramnath of Scroll opined: "A flattering and flattening portrait of J Jayalalithaa. Thalaivii survives the pedestrian writing and unimaginative direction". Monika Kukreja of Hindustan Times stated: "The Kangana Ranaut-starrer is packed with solid performances and an attention to period detail, but is let down by its length and an incomplete-feeling story." Srivatsan of The Hindu opined: "it is only fair to say that Thalaivii is a half-biopic. The problem with Thalaivii is not exactly the 'masala-fication' of a dramatic life in public. It is bending facts with fiction, through hearsay stories".

Overseas 
Ambica Sachin of Khaleej Times gave the film a rating of 3/5 praising Ranaut's performance she wrote, "Kangana doesn’t try to mimic the iconic leader but rather delves into the spirit of a woman whose journey from Ammu to Amma, a figure revered and reviled in equal measures by those who knew her, is the stuff of folklore". Manjusha Radhakrishnan writes for Gulf News, in her review, she noted: "Everything’s on the nose in this film as they depict every situation and twist with no nuance", whereas praised, "Kangana Ranaut and Arvind Swamy shine in this overdramatic political drama". She assigned a score of 2.5 on 5. Mike McCahill of The Guardian summarized: "While more nuanced than many of its star's recent statements - it could hardly be otherwise - the film still feels like a passive-aggressive idea of doubling down." He compared the plot and character as if Margaret Thatcher went to Rank Charm School, awarding it 2 stars out of 5.

Year-end lists 
Several publications listed Thalaivii as one of the best films of 2021. Shubhra Gupta of The Indian Express listed it as one of the best movies of 2021. Aparita Bhandari of Paste listed it as one of the top ten best Bollywood movies of 2021. Times of India listed it as one of the top thirty best Hindi movies of 2021. Jasmine Ting and Corinne Sullivan of Cosmopolitan listed it as one of the twenty-six best Bollywood movies of 2021. Kumari Purvi of SheThePeople listed it as one of the top five best films of 2021. Subhash K. Jha of Rediff listed it as one of the seven must-watch films of 2021. Kunal Purandare of Forbes India picked Thalaivii as one of his favourite movies of 2021. CNN-IBN listed it as one of the top female-lead films of 2021. Avantika Chopra of IndiaTimes listed it as one of the best women-centric films of 2021. Thalaivii was featured among the top twenty best Tamil language films at the 13th Norway Tamil Film Festival. For her performance in Thalaivii, Twinkle Khanna of Pinkvilla listed Ranaut as the best female performer of the year 2021.

Awards and nominations 

Ranaut was initially nominated for the Filmfare Award for Best Actress, but her nomination was revoked after she accused Filmfare of having an unethical awarding system.

Legal issues 
The producers initially received permission from Jayalalithaa's nephew Deepak Jayakumar in his request to make it as "an honest portrayal of her life". However, Jayalalithaa's niece, Deepa Jayakumar, in November 2019, registered a complaint against the film's makers through the Madras High Court. She asserted that she was the legal heir of Jayalalitha and that before making a movie or a web series about her life, the creators of the film should have approached her. She also said that the film makers have no legal right to make a film about the life of Jayalalithaa, which could affect the privacy of her aunt and her family. Deepa also demanded that the whole script be sent to her well before movie comes to the theatres. The Madras High Court gave Deepa approval to take legal action against director AL Vijay, film producer Vishnu and Gautham Vasudev Menon who also made a web series about Jayalalithaa's life titled Queen which starred Ramya Krishnan essaying Jayalalithaa's role.

References

External links 
 
 

2021 multilingual films
2020s Hindi-language films
Indian biographical films
Indian multilingual films
2020s Tamil-language films
Films directed by A. L. Vijay
Films scored by G. V. Prakash Kumar
Jayalalithaa
Cultural depictions of Indira Gandhi
M. G. Ramachandran